Eric J. Cole (born June 12, 1988) is an American professional golfer from Delray Beach, Florida who currently plays on the PGA Tour. His parents Bobby Cole and Laura Baugh were both professional golfers.

Early life and amateur career 
Cole was born in 1988, the year after his parents remarried, two years after their divorce, as one of seven siblings. With both parents being tour golfers, Cole grew up on golf courses and started playing seriously at age 11. He never had other coaches than his parents.

At age 14, while playing high school golf, Cole became a friend of Sam Saunders, the grandson of Arnold Palmer. Cole also got to know Palmer and the three of them played golf at Palmer's home clubs, Bay Hill Club and Lodge in Florida and Latrobe Country Club in Pennsylvania. In later years, Cole also caddied for Saunders at the Arnold Palmer Invitational on the PGA Tour.

Professional career 
He won 56 times on the Minor League Golf Tour including winning the tour championship in 2009 and 2021.

Cole earned his Korn Ferry Tour card in 2017 and played in eight events, making two cuts. His best finish was a tie for 39th place. He returned to the Korn Ferry Tour for the 2021 season and made 31 starts. His first top-10 finish came at the Savannah Golf Championship in October 2020, where he finished tied for third. He had five top-10s in the 2022 season, including two third-place finishes.

Cole qualified for the 2021 U.S. Open at Torrey Pines Golf Course, where he missed the cut after rounds of 77-73.

Cole finished tied for third in the 2022 Korn Ferry Tour Championship to earn his PGA Tour card for the 2023 season. In February, he finished tied with Chris Kirk atop the leaderboard of the Honda Classic before Kirk won with a birdie on the first playoff hole.

Personal life
Cole is the son of Bobby Cole, who won the Buick Open in 1977 and had three top-10 finishes in major championships. In 1966, Cole's father, 18 years old, became the youngest winner ever of the British Amateur. Cole's mother, Laura Baugh, was the 1971 U.S. Women's Amateur champion, the youngest winner ever a 16 year old, and the 1973 LPGA Rookie of the Year.

Playoff record
PGA Tour playoff record (0–1)

Results in major championships

CUT = missed the half-way cut

Results in The Players Championship

"T" indicates a tie for a place

See also
2022 Korn Ferry Tour Finals graduates

References

External links

American male golfers
PGA Tour golfers
Korn Ferry Tour graduates
Golfers from Florida
1988 births
Living people